Archaeodictyna is a genus of  cribellate araneomorph spiders in the family Dictynidae, and was first described by Lodovico di Caporiacco in 1928.

Species
 it contains nine species:
Archaeodictyna ammophila (Menge, 1871) – Europe to Central Asia
Archaeodictyna anguiniceps (Simon, 1899) (type) – North, East Africa
Archaeodictyna condocta (O. Pickard-Cambridge, 1876) – North Africa, Kazakhstan
Archaeodictyna consecuta (O. Pickard-Cambridge, 1872) – Europe, Caucasus, Russia (Europe to South Siberia), Central Asia, China
Archaeodictyna minutissima (Miller, 1958) – Italy, Austria, Czechia, Slovakia, Ukraine, Russia (Europe)
Archaeodictyna sexnotata (Simon, 1890) – Yemen
Archaeodictyna suedicola (Simon, 1890) – Yemen
Archaeodictyna tazzeiti (Denis, 1954) – Algeria
Archaeodictyna ulova Griswold & Meikle-Griswold, 1987 – South Africa

References

Araneomorphae genera
Dictynidae
Spiders of Africa
Spiders of Asia
Spiders of Europe